SUSE, Suse, or Susa may refer to:

Linux 
 SUSE, an open source software company 
 SUSE Linux Enterprise, an operating system developed by SUSE for businesses
 openSUSE, a community-maintained operating system sponsored by SUSE
 SUSE Linux, an operating system that SUSE historically distributed to retail customers
 The openSUSE Project, the community project responsible for openSUSE
 SUSE Enterprise Storage, Linux-based data storage

Places 
Fort Suse, in Iraq
Sus, Azerbaijan
Susa, ancient capital of Elam and the Achaemenid Empire

People 
Suse Heinze (born 1920), a German diver